Odell is an English unisex given name which may refer to:

 Odell Barnes (disambiguation), several people
 Odell Barry (1941–2022), American former football player
 Odell Beckham Jr. (born 1992), American National Football League player
 Odell Borg, an American native flute maker
 Odell Brown (1940–2011), American jazz organist
 Odell Haggins (born 1967), American college football coach and former National Football League player
 Odell Hale (1908–1980), American Major League Baseball player
 Odell Hodge, an American basketball player
 Odell Horton, a United States federal judge
 Odell Jones, a Major League Baseball pitcher
 Odell Manuel, New Zealand former professional rugby league footballer and Australian Powerlifting champion
 Odell McLeod, an American country-gospel singer
 Odell Murray, an Antigua and Barbudan international footballer
 O'dell Owens (1947-2022), American physician
 Odell Pollard, an American attorney
 Odell Shepard (1884–1967), American professor, poet, and politician, 1938 Pulitzer Prize winner
 Odell Stautzenberger (1924-2002), American football player
 Odell Thurman (born 1983), American former National Football League player
 Odell Waller (1917–1942), African-American sharecropper executed for fatally shooting his white landlord
 Odell Willis (born 1984), Canadian Football League player

Fictional characters
Odell Watkins, a fictional character played on the television series The Wire

See also
Odel Offiah (born 2002), English footballer
Odell (surname)

English-language masculine given names
English-language unisex given names